KBKW (1450 AM) is a commercial radio station licensed to Aberdeen, Washington, and serving the area around Grays Harbor.  The station is currently owned by Sacred Heart Radio, Inc. a not-for-profit entity   It airs a Catholic radio format.

Programming is simulcast on 250 watt FM translator 103.5 K278CU in Aberdeen.

Programming
Programming 24/7 from Sacred Heart Radio

History
The station originally signed on the air on August 1, 1949, as KBKW. The call sign represented the founder's initials, Ben K. Weatherwax.  Weatherwax was part of a prominent local family, and was the first full-time radio newsman in Southwest Washington, employed at KXRO until the launch of KBKW.

In later years, the call letters changed to KAYO, with a switch to a country music format.  On April 28, 1975, the station reverted to the current call sign KBKW, with the FM sister station retaining the KAYO call letters.  The KAYO call letters have since switched to an FM station in Alaska.

On January 18, 2022, KBKW changed its format from news/talk to a simulcast of KSWW's HD3 subchannel's classic country format as "Timber Country 94.7", which is fed on translator K234AU.

As of late 2022, KBKW 1450 and its FM translator were sold to Sacred Heart Radio, and it an outreach for Catholic programming.

References

External links

FCC History Cards for KBKW

BKW
Radio stations established in 1949
1949 establishments in Washington (state)